Oulu City Library is a municipal and regional library in Oulu, Finland. The main library building is located in the city centre near the market square. There are also 24 other library branches in the districts of Oulu and a patient library in Oulu University Hospital.

The main library was moved from Northern Ostrobothnia museum building to the present building designed by architects Marjatta and Martti Jaatinen in 1982.

References

External links
 
 Oulu City Library

Culture in Oulu
Libraries in Finland
Public libraries
Buildings and structures in Oulu
Pokkinen
Libraries established in 1877